Cruelty Free International is an animal protection and advocacy group that campaigns for the abolition of all animal experiments. They organise certification of cruelty-free products which are marked with the symbol of a leaping bunny.

It was founded in 1898 by Irish writer and suffragette, Frances Power Cobbe, as the British Union for the Abolition of Vivisection. In 2012, the BUAV joined with the New England Anti-Vivisection Society to establish a new international organisation to campaign against the testing of cosmetics on animals—Cruelty Free International. This was launched by BUAV supporter Ricky Gervais. In 2015, the parent organisation merged into this new organization, taking its name and branding for all its activities.

Background

BUAV was founded on 14 June 1898 by Frances Power Cobbe during a public meeting in Bristol, England. Known at first as the British Union, or "the Union", it campaigned at first against the use of dogs in vivisection, and came close to achieving success with the 1919 Dogs (Protection) Bill, which almost became law. Tentative discussion toward amalgamation with the National Anti-Vivisection Society (NAVS), including during the early 1960s under the contemporary NAVS Committee Secretary, Wilfred Risdon, could not be successfully concluded. In recent years, it successfully lobbied the British government into abolishing the oral  test in the 1990s. The BUAV was also closely involved in the lobbying which led to the adoption in the European Union of the 7th Amendment to the Cosmetics Directive, which effectively banned both the testing of cosmetics products and their ingredients on animals and also the sale of products in the EU which have been animal-tested anywhere in the world.

Focus
In recent years, the organisation has focused on a number of new areas, including the promotion of non-animal tested products; the European Union's REACH proposal to test tens of thousands of chemicals on millions of animals; and the use of non-human primates in experimentation. It acts as the secretariat of the European Coalition to End Animal Experiments (ECEAE), established in 1990, and its chief executive, Michelle Thew, acts as chief executive of the coalition.

It helps consumers to identify and purchase products that have not been tested on animals through its Humane Cosmetics and Humane Household Products Standards (HCS and HHPS). These are audited accreditation schemes for retail companies which confirm that neither their products nor their ingredients are tested on animals. These standards are also run in a number of European countries and in the United States. A list of approved companies is available and regularly updated on their website. It also runs a primate sanctuary in Thailand for 50 rescued macaques.

Undercover investigations
Undercover investigations included the exposure of the breeding and supply of monkeys from Nafovanny in Vietnam for experimentation in Europe and the US. and Covance's contract testing laboratory in Germany. It pursued a judicial review against the Home Office as a result of its findings in the Cambridge investigation. The High Court ruled in support of the Government in three of the four issues, and in favour of the BUAV on one issue, though this was later overturned on appeal with the Home Office awarded costs. Other investigations in 2007 highlighted the primate trade from Malaysia and Spain.

See also
 Blue Cross (animal charity)
 Brown Dog affair, a political controversy about vivisection that raged in Edwardian England from 1903 until 1910.
 Cambridge University primate experiments
List of animal rights groups
 Nafovanny
 Women and animal advocacy

References

Further reading
The archives of the BUAV (ref U DBV) are held at the Hull History Centre and details of holdings on its online catalogue.

External links
Website
YouTube channel

1898 establishments in the United Kingdom
Animal rights organizations
Animal welfare organisations based in the United Kingdom
Anti-vivisection organizations
International organisations based in London
Organisations based in the London Borough of Islington
Toxicology in the United Kingdom